This is a list of episodes for Season 8 of Late Night with Conan O'Brien, which aired from September 5, 2000, to August 17, 2001.

Series overview

Season 8

References

Episodes (season 08)